John Olof "Olle" Widestrand (9 July 1932 – 25 March 2018), was a Swedish parish-musician, teacher and composer. He is represented in Den svenska psalmboken 1986 with two works (number 61 and 90) and several other hymnals with one hymn. He has written several children's songs and published songbooks and educational materials for schools. He lived in the town of Jönköping until his death.

Hymns
 Blott i det öppna (1986 number 90), lyrics by Britt G. Hallqvist set to music 1974 by Olle Widestrand and re-written by himself 1980
 Det är advent (also known as "Ett litet barn av Davids hus) in several hymnals
 Lågorna är många (1986 number 61), set to music in 1974, lyrics by Anders Frostenson.

References 

1932 births
2018 deaths
Swedish composers
Swedish male composers
People from Jönköping